Robert George Wahlberg (born December 18, 1967) is an American actor who has appeared in films such as Southie, Mystic River and The Departed.

Life and career
Born in the Dorchester neighborhood of Boston, Robert is the brother of Arthur, Jim, Paul, Tracey, Michelle, Debbie (died 2003), and actors/musicians Mark and Donnie Wahlberg. He also has three half-siblings from his father's first marriage: Donna, Scott, and Buddy. His mother, Alma Elaine (née Donnelly), was a bank clerk and nurse's aid, and his father, Donald Edmond Wahlberg, Sr., was a teamster who worked as a delivery driver; the two divorced in 1982. His father, a U.S. Army veteran of the Korean War, died on February 14, 2008.
His father was of Swedish and Irish descent, while his maternal ancestry is Irish, French-Canadian, and English.

He has two children, Oscar and Charlie, from his marriage to Gina Santangelo.

Wahlberg has appeared in films such as Southie, Orphan, Scenes of the Crime, Moonlight Mile, Mystic River, The Departed, Gone Baby Gone,  Don McKay and The Equalizer.

Filmography

References

External links

1967 births
20th-century American male actors
21st-century American male actors
American male film actors
American people of English descent
American people of French-Canadian descent
American people of Irish descent
American people of Swedish descent
Living people
Male actors from Boston
Robert
People from Dorchester, Massachusetts